Saeed El-Hadj (Arabic:سعيد الحاج) (born 2 February 1990) is a Qatari footballer. He currently plays for Al-Gharafa .

References

External links
 

Qatari footballers
1990 births
Living people
Al-Gharafa SC players
Umm Salal SC players
Al Kharaitiyat SC players
Muaither SC players
Association football defenders
Qatar Stars League players
Qatari Second Division players